Dichasianthus is a genus of flowering plants belonging to the family Brassicaceae.

Its native range is Central Asia.

Species:

Dichasianthus confertus 
Dichasianthus runcinatus 
Dichasianthus subtilissimus

References

Brassicaceae
Brassicaceae genera